Alfredo Vásquez Acevedo was a Uruguayan rector and politician.

He served as member of the National Council of Administration.

He is on the 500 Uruguayan peso and there is an Institute in Montevideo named for him.

References 

University of the Republic (Uruguay) rectors

Year of birth missing
Year of death missing